Andaman Ammayi is a 1979 Telugu-language drama film, produced by T. Govindarajan under the Venus Combines banner and directed by V. Madhusudhana Rao. It stars Akkineni Nageswara Rao,  Vanisri, and music composed by K. V. Mahadevan. The film is a remake of the Tamil film Andaman Kadhali (1978). It was released on 15 June 1979.

Plot 
Shekar (Akkineni Nageswara Rao) & Chandra (Vanisri) are lovebirds at Andaman whose love blossoms on the island and they get married in a temple without anyone's knowledge. Once Chandra suffers severe fever and Shekar hurries for the doctor when Dr. Vedantha Rao (Allu Ramalingaiah) heckles and makes fun of him. In that anger, Shekar strikes him and he dies. Frightened, Shekar escapes from the island while traveling he rescues a rich man on the deck who shelters him, and before dying he places Shekar as the guardian to his property & daughter Kavitha (Lakshmi Sri). After 20 years, Shekar becomes a millionaire and has cared for Kavitha more than his life. Once Kavitha wants to visit an art exhibition at Andaman, with a little bit of hesitation Shekar moves. After reaching there Shekar is surprised to see Dr. Vedantha Rao alive when he makes him remember the past and the doctor feels ashamed for his deed and apologizes to Shekar. He requests Shekar to stay with him and he too helps in identifying his wife. Parallelly, in the exhibition, Kavitha gets acquainted with a modern sculptor Madan (Chandra Mohan), and falls for him. But he refuses her love then Shekar hits Madan to marry Kavitha for which he is ready to pay anything. Here Madan demands to find his cowardly father who has cheated on his mother. To accomplish his life ambition of making a statue of him and naming it a cheater. Shekar agrees with it when Madan keeps a condition that the person whom he is going to show must be accepted by his mother. Immediately, Shekar goes in contact with Madan's mother shockingly, she is none other than Chandra when their hearts are melted with joy at the reunion. After that, Shekar clarifies how situations divided them and also asks her to reveal the truth to Madan. But Chandra refuses, as she well knows what would happen in the next minute. Here Shekar challenges he will bring out the reality under any circumstances. From there onwards, Shekar tries in many ways to expose his identity through Chandra but fails. At last, Shekar decides to commit suicide to make Chandra come out. At the same time, Madan witnesses the marriage photograph of Shekar & Chandra when he understands the virtue of his father. Soon, Madan rushes, rescues Shekar, and says that now he will make his statue to worship. Finally, the movie ends on a happy note with the marriage of Madan & Kavitha.

Cast 
Akkineni Nageswara Rao as Shekar
Vanisri as Chandra
Chandra Mohan as Madan
Prabhakar Reddy
Allu Ramalingaiah as Dr. Vedantha Rao
Rallapalli as Hanuman Prasad
Potti Prasad
Rama Prabha as Bhanumathi
Annapurna as Rajamma
Madhavi as Puppy
Lakshmi Sri as Kavitha
Baby Varalakshmi as Rani

Soundtrack 
Music composed by K. V. Mahadevan. Lyrics were written by Acharya Aatreya.

References

External links 
 

1979 drama films
1979 films
Films directed by V. Madhusudhana Rao
Films scored by K. V. Mahadevan
Indian drama films
Telugu remakes of Tamil films